Cykelslangen (lit.: Bicycle Snake) is a bridge for bicyclists in Copenhagen.

The bridge was designed by Dissing+Weitling and opened to the public on 28 June 2014. The project cost 32 million Danish krone ($5.74 million).

References

Bridges in Copenhagen
Port of Copenhagen
Bridges completed in 2014
Cyclist bridges in Denmark